Morten Qvenild Discography

Solo albums 

2015: Personal Piano (Hubro Music)
2016: The HyPer(Sonal) Piano Project - Towards A (Per)Sonal Topography Of Grand Piano And Electronics (Hubro Music)
2019: Landet Bortanfor Landet - Område 51 (Grappa Musikkforlag, GRLP4651)

Collaborations 
In The Country
2005: This Was the Pace of My Heartbeat (Rune Grammofon)
2006: Losing Stones, Collecting Bones (Rune Grammofon)
2009: Whiteout (Rune Grammofon)
2011: Sounds and Sights (Live album with DVD, Rune Grammofon)
2013: Sunset Sunrise (ACT)

Østenfor Sol
1998: Syng, Dovre (Major Studio)
2001: Troillspel (Major Studio)

Shining
2001: Where the Ragged People Go (Blå Productions)
2003: Sweet Shanghai Devil (Jazzland Recordings)
2005: In the Kingdom of Kitsch You Will Be a Monster (Rune Grammofon)

Solveig Slettahjell Slow Motion Orchestra
2001: Slow Motion Orchestra (Curling Legs)
2004: Silver (Curling Legs)
2005: Pixiedust (Curling Legs)
2006: Good Rain (Curling Legs)
2009: Tarpan Seasons (Universal)

Jaga Jazzist
2001: A Livingroom Hush (Press Play, Ninja Tune, 2002)
2002: The Stix (WEA, Ninja Tune)
2004: Day (EP, Ninja Tune)

The National Bank
2004: The National Bank
2008: Come On over to the Other Side

Trinity
2004: Sparkling (Jazzaway Records)
2009: Breaking The Mold (Clean Feed)

Susanna & the Magical Orchestra (Susanna Wallumrød)
2004: List of Lights and Buoys (Rune Grammofon)
2006: Melody Mountain (Rune Grammofon)
2009: 3 (Rune Grammofon)

Susanne Sundfør
2007: Susanne Sundfør (Your Favourite Music), on two tracks
2010: The Brothel (EMI Norway), as producer
2011: A Night at Salle Pleyel (EMI Norway)

Magic Pocket
2011: The Katabatic Wind (Bolage)

Duo live with Solveig Slettahjell
2012: Antologie (Universal)

sPacemoNkey duo with Gard Nilssen
2014: The Karman Line (Hubro Music)

Finland including with Ivar Grydeland, Jo Berger Myhre, Pål Hausken
2015: Rainy Omen (Hubro Music)

As a guest musician 
2000: Ra - Live @ blaa
2001: OJ Trio - Breaks Even
2004: Jan Martin Smørdal's Acoustic Accident - Q. S.
2005: Nils Petter Molvær - Remakes (Sula Records)
2006: Christer Knutsen - Grand Hotel
2006: Thomas Dybdahl - Science
2007: Susanna Wallumrød - Sonata Mix Dwarf Cosmos
2011: Mathias Eick - Skala (ECM)

References

External links
In The Country Website

Qvenild, Morten
Qvenild, Morten